The Federal Deposit Insurance Corporation Improvement Act of 1991 (FDICIA), passed during the savings and loan crisis in the United States, strengthened the power of the Federal Deposit Insurance Corporation.

It allowed the FDIC to borrow directly from the Treasury department and mandated that the FDIC resolve failed banks using the least costly method available.  It also ordered the FDIC to assess insurance premiums according to risk and created new capital requirements.

Prompt Corrective Action
Title I, § 131(a), Prompt Corrective Action, mandates progressive penalties against banks that exhibit progressively deteriorating capital ratios.  At the lower extreme, a critically undercapitalized Federal Deposit Insurance Corporation (FDIC)-regulated institution (i.e., one with a ratio of total capital / assets below 2%) is required to be taken into receivership by the FDIC in order to minimize long-term losses to the FDIC.  The motivation behind the law is to provide incentives for banks to address problems while they are still small enough to be manageable.  Spong (2000, pages 90–95) summarizes the details (http://www.kansascityfed.org/publicat/bankingregulation/RegsBook2000.pdf).

In an interview on Bill Moyers Journal broadcast April 3, 2009, former bank regulator William K. Black asserted that federal officials were ignoring the PCA law requiring them to put insolvent banks into receivership. The PCA law applies only to institutions insured by the FDIC and therefore would not affect, for better or worse, companies such as AIG.

See also
Truth in Savings Act

References

External links 
 Federal Deposit Insurance Corporation Improvement Act of 1991 as amended (PDF/details) in the GPO Statute Compilations collection
 US Code Title 12, 1831o, Prompt Corrective Action
 William K. Black comments on PCA 

102nd United States Congress
1991 in law
United States federal banking legislation
Federal Deposit Insurance Corporation
Savings and loan crisis
1991 in American politics
1991 in economics
1991 in the United States